George E. Johnson (born June 19, 1947) is a retired American professional basketball player born in Harleton, Texas.

A 6'11" center from Stephen F. Austin State University, where he was a teammate of San Antonio Spurs great James Silas.  Johnson played in the National Basketball Association and American Basketball Association from 1970 to 1974. He was a member of the Baltimore Bullets, Dallas Chaparrals and Houston Rockets. In his NBA/ABA career, Johnson averaged 3.7 points per game and 5.0 rebounds per game.

External links
Career statistics

1947 births
Living people
American expatriate basketball people in Italy
American men's basketball players
Baltimore Bullets (1963–1973) draft picks
Baltimore Bullets (1963–1973) players
Basketball players from Texas
Centers (basketball)
Dallas Chaparrals players
Delaware Blue Bombers players
Houston Rockets players
People from Harrison County, Texas
Stephen F. Austin Lumberjacks basketball players